Carlton Edison Friend (April 18, 1869 – February 23, 1948) was an American Republican politician who served as the 28th Lieutenant Governor of Kansas from 1939 until 1943.

Biography
Friend was born in 1869 in Saint Joseph, Missouri and later graduated from Kansas State College (now Kansas State University). He entered politics in 1932, being elected to the Kansas State Senate that year, and became Lieutenant Governor in 1939, serving until 1943. In 1940, Friend was appointed vice president of the executive committee of the University of Kansas Endowment Association. He served in that position until his death in Lawrence, Kansas on February 23, 1948.

References

External links
 

Lieutenant Governors of Kansas
1869 births
1948 deaths
Kansas Republicans
Kansas State University alumni
People from St. Joseph, Missouri
People from Lawrence, Kansas